Harry Franklin Porter (August 31, 1882 in Bridgeport, Connecticut – June 27, 1965) was a high jumper from the United States of America. He was a member of the Irish American Athletic Club, and won gold in the High Jump in the 1908 Summer Olympics at a mark of 6'3".  He graduated from Cornell University.

According to his 2019 trading card; "it was not until after his graduation that he became imbued with the athletic spirit. In 1907 and 1908, Porter won the National Amateur Athletic Union championship indoor running high jump title, making a new record, 6ft 1½ inches, and in the latter year he won the outdoor National and Metropolitan Amateur Athletic Union championship." He was murdered in 1965.

Notes

References

External links
Archives of Irish America - NYU
Cornell Olympians
Infoplease list of high jump gold medalists

Winged Fist Organization

1882 births
1965 deaths
Sportspeople from Bridgeport, Connecticut
Track and field athletes from Connecticut
American male high jumpers
Cornell University alumni
Athletes (track and field) at the 1908 Summer Olympics
Medalists at the 1908 Summer Olympics
Olympic gold medalists for the United States in track and field
Olympic male high jumpers